Traubel is a surname. Notable with the surname include:

Helen Traubel (1899–1972), American opera and concert singer
Horace Traubel (1858–1919), American poet
Sarah Traubel (born 1986), German opera singer

Surnames of German origin